President Joe Biden began his presidency with fewer vacancies to fill than his predecessor. President Biden pledged to nominate people with diverse backgrounds and professional experience. Biden also pledged to nominate the first Black woman to the Supreme Court of the United States.

By the end of 2021, 41 judges had been confirmed, the most since Ronald Reagan. By the end of his first year in office, Biden had nominated 73 individuals for federal judgeships, one more than president Donald Trump during the same point in his presidency.

Supreme Court

Confirmed nominee
Supreme Court of the United States

Ketanji Brown Jackson (of Washington, D.C.): On February 25, 2022, President Joe Biden announced that he would nominate Judge Ketanji Brown Jackson to succeed Stephen Breyer as an associate justice of the Supreme Court of the United States. At the time of her pending nomination, Jackson was a judge on the United States Court of Appeals for the District of Columbia Circuit, to which she was appointed by Biden in 2021. On February 28, 2022, her nomination was sent to the Senate. Senate Minority Leader Mitch McConnell characterized Jackson as "the favored choice of far-left dark money groups that have spent years attacking the legitimacy and structure of the court itself". The Republican National Committee called Jackson "a radical, left-wing activist who would rubber stamp Biden’s disastrous agenda". Republican Senator Lindsey Graham, who had previously voted in favor of Jackson's confirmation to the DC Circuit Court of Appeals, stated that the nomination "means the radical Left has won President Biden over yet again". Her confirmation hearings before the Senate Judiciary Committee opened on March 21. After the Judiciary Committee deadlocked in an 11–11 vote, her nomination was advanced on April 4 by a 53–47 procedural vote in the Senate. She was subsequently confirmed by the same margin on April 7, 2022.

Appellate nominees

Confirmed nominees

United States Court of Appeals for the Second Circuit
Eunice C. Lee (of New York): On May 12, 2021, President Biden nominated Lee to serve as a United States circuit judge for the United States Court of Appeals for the Second Circuit to the seat vacated by Judge Robert Katzmann, who took senior status on January 21, 2021. On June 9, 2021, a hearing on her nomination was held before the Senate Judiciary Committee. During her confirmation hearing in 2021, she distanced herself from the contents of a letter she wrote as an Ohio State undergrad in 1991, which talks about Thomas being a "black conservative." On July 15, 2021, her nomination was reported out of committee by a 11–10 vote; Senator Lindsey Graham passed on the vote. On August 3, 2021, U.S. Senate Majority Leader Chuck Schumer filed cloture on Lee's nomination. On August 5, 2021, the Senate voted 50–49 in favor of cloture on Lee's nomination, with Senator Graham absent. On August 7, 2021, her nomination was confirmed by a 50–47 vote. She is the second African American woman ever to serve on the Second Circuit and the only judge with experience as a federal defender serving on that circuit.

United States Court of Appeals for the Third Circuit
Arianna J. Freeman (of Pennsylvania): On January 19, 2022, President Joe Biden announced his intent to nominate Freeman  to serve as a United States circuit judge of the United States Court of Appeals for the Third Circuit. President Biden nominated Freeman to the seat vacated by Judge Theodore McKee, who on July 29, 2021, notified the White House that he intended to assume senior status upon confirmation of his successor. On January 28, 2022, following Justice Stephen Breyer's announcement of his intention to retire as an Associate Justice of the U.S. Supreme Court, Freeman was mentioned as one of the potential nominees for a Supreme Court appointment by President Joe Biden. On March 2, 2022, a hearing on her nomination was held before the Senate Judiciary Committee. During her confirmation hearing, Republican senators criticized her work as a public defender. On April 4, 2022, the committee were deadlocked on her nomination by an 11–11 vote. On June 22, 2022, the Senate discharged her nomination from committee by a 50–48 vote. On September 12, 2022, the United States Senate invoked cloture on her nomination by a 45–44 vote. On September 13, 2022, the Senate did not confirm her nomination by a 47–50 vote. On September 29, 2022, her nomination was confirmed by a 50-47 vote. She is the first African-American woman to serve on the Third Circuit.

United States Court of Appeals for the Sixth Circuit
Andre Mathis (of Tennessee): On November 17, 2021, President Biden announced his intent to nominate Mathis to serve as a United States circuit judge of the United States Court of Appeals for the Sixth Circuit; his nomination was sent to the Senate the following day. President Biden nominated Mathis to the seat vacated by Judge Bernice B. Donald, who will assume senior status upon confirmation of her successor. On January 3, 2022, his nomination was returned to the President under Rule XXXI, Paragraph 6 of the United States Senate; he was renominated later the same day. On January 12, 2022, a hearing on his nomination was held before the Senate Judiciary Committee. During the hearing, senator Marsha Blackburn said she had "serious concerns" about Mathis' experience and referenced his "rap sheet" due in part to three previous speeding tickets. She stated, "He has a rap sheet with a laundry list of citations, including multiple failures to appear in court. In Tennessee, we expect our judges to respect the law. If Mr. Mathis thought he was above the law before, imagine how he'll conduct himself if he's confirmed as a federal judge." Blackburn and fellow senator Bill Hagerty recommended an alternative pick, Camille McMullen, a Democratic appointee to the Tennessee Court of Criminal Appeals who is also Black. On February 10, 2022, his nomination was reported favorably out of committee in a 12-10 vote. On September 7, 2022, the United States Senate invoked cloture on his nomination by a 48–45 vote. On September 8, 2022, the Senate confirmed his nomination by a 48–47 vote.

United States Court of Appeals for the Ninth Circuit
Lucy Koh (of California): On September 8, 2021, President Biden announced his intention to renominate Koh to be a United States circuit judge of the United States Court of Appeals for the Ninth Circuit. On September 20, 2021, her nomination was sent to the Senate. President Biden nominated Koh to the seat to be vacated by Judge Richard Paez, who will assume senior status upon confirmation of a successor. On October 6, 2021, a hearing on her nomination was held before the Senate Judiciary Committee. During her hearing, Koh was criticized by Republicans senators for her decisions related to religious rights during the COVID-19 pandemic. On October 28, 2021, her nomination was reported out of committee by a 13–9 vote. On December 9, 2021, the U.S. Senate invoked cloture on her nomination by a 51–38 vote. On December 13, 2021, Koh was confirmed by a 50–45 vote.
Jennifer Sung (of Oregon): On June 30, 2021, President Biden announced his intent to nominate Sung to serve as a United States circuit judge of the United States Court of Appeals for the Ninth Circuit. On July 13, 2021, her nomination was sent to the Senate. President Biden nominated Sung to the seat to be vacated by Judge Susan P. Graber, who will assume senior status upon confirmation of a successor. On September 14, 2021, a hearing on her nomination was held before the Senate Judiciary Committee. During the hearing, Senators questioned her about her decision to sign a letter regarding Brett Kavanaugh's nomination to the U.S. Supreme Court. The letter accused Kavanaugh of being an "intellectually and morally bankrupt ideologue" and claimed that "people will die if he is confirmed". Sung said she recognized that much of the letter's rhetoric "was overheated," but she did not disavow the letter or say "whether she thought Kavanaugh was indeed 'intellectually and morally bankrupt.'" The Senate Judiciary Committee was deadlocked by a 10–10 vote. On November 3, 2021, the Senate discharged Sung's nomination from committee by a 49–49 vote, with Vice President Kamala Harris breaking the tie. On December 9, 2021, the U.S. Senate invoked cloture on her nomination by a 48–39 vote. On December 15, 2021, her nomination was confirmed by a 50–49 vote.

Stalled nominees

United States Court of Appeals for the First Circuit
Julie Rikelman: On July 29, 2022, President Joe Biden announced his intent to nominate Rikelman to serve as a United States circuit judge of the United States Court of Appeals for the First Circuit. On August 1, 2022, her nomination was sent to the Senate. President Biden nominated Rikelman to the seat vacated by Judge Sandra Lynch, who will assume senior status upon confirmation of a successor. Rikelman was unanimously rated "well qualified" for the judgeship by the American Bar Association's Standing Committee on the Federal Judiciary. On September 21, 2022, a hearing on her nomination was held before the Senate Judiciary Committee. During her confirmation hearing, she was questioned by several Republican senators over her outspoken advocacy for abortion. Rikelman was also questioned about a law review article she authored discussing appellate decisions permitting mandatory blood collection for DNA testing under the Fourth Amendment, arguing that such mandatory collection was prohibited by the U.S. Constitution. On December 1, 2022, her nomination was deadlocked by the Judiciary Committee by an 11–11 vote. On January 3, 2023, her nomination was returned to the President under Rule XXXI, Paragraph 6 of the United States Senate; she was renominated later the same day. On February 9, 2023, her nomination was reported out of committee by an 11–10 vote. Her nomination is pending before the United States Senate.

United States Court of Appeals for the Sixth Circuit
Rachel Bloomekatz: On May 25, 2022, President Joe Biden nominated Bloomekatz to serve as a United States circuit judge of the United States Court of Appeals for the Sixth Circuit. President Biden nominated Bloomekatz to the seat to be vacated by Judge R. Guy Cole Jr., who would assume senior status on January 9, 2023. A hearing on her nomination was held before the Senate Judiciary Committee on June 22, 2022. During her confirmation hearing, Republican senators questioned her about gun control cases and the pro bono work that she had been involved with. On August 4, 2022, the Senate Judiciary Committee was deadlocked on her nomination by a 10–10–2 vote. On January 3, 2023, her nomination was returned to the President under Rule XXXI, Paragraph 6 of the United States Senate; she was renominated later the same day. On February 9, 2023, her nomination was reported out of committee by an 11–10 vote. Her nomination is pending before the United States Senate.

United States Court of Appeals for the Ninth Circuit
Anthony Johnstone: On September 2, 2022, President Joe Biden announced his intent to nominate Johnstone to serve as a United States circuit judge of the United States Court of Appeals for the Ninth Circuit. On September 6, 2022, his nomination was sent to the Senate. President Biden will nominate Johnstone to the seat to be vacated by Judge Sidney R. Thomas, who will assume senior status upon confirmation of a successor. Senator Steven Daines of Montana opposed the nomination, claiming that Johnstone was too political and partisan to be a judge and claiming the White House had not adequately consulted him on the nomination. On October 12, 2022, a hearing on his nomination was held before the Senate Judiciary Committee. He was sharply questioned about his views on election integrity and religious freedom issues. On December 1, 2022, his nomination was reported out of committee by an 11–10 vote, with Senator Lindsey Graham passed on the vote. On January 3, 2023, his nomination was returned to the President under Rule XXXI, Paragraph 6 of the United States Senate; he was renominated later the same day. On February 2, 2023, the committee deadlocked on his nomination by a 10–10 vote, which means that his nomination would be reconsidered. On February 9, 2023, his nomination was reported out of committee by an 11–10 vote. His nomination is pending before the United States Senate.

United States Court of Appeals for the Eleventh Circuit
Nancy Abudu: On December 23, 2021, President Joe Biden announced his intent to nominate Abudu to serve as a United States circuit judge of the United States Court of Appeals for the Eleventh Circuit. On January 10, 2022, her nomination was sent to the Senate. President Biden nominated Abudu to the seat vacated by Judge Beverly B. Martin, who retired on September 30, 2021. Abudu was immediately attacked as a leftist extremist, noting her support for restoring voting rights for felons and past representation of abortion clinics. On April 27, 2022, a hearing on her nomination was held before the Senate Judiciary Committee. On May 26, 2022, the Judiciary Committee deadlocked on her nomination by an 11–11 vote. On January 3, 2023, her nomination was returned to the President under Rule XXXI, Paragraph 6 of the United States Senate; she was renominated later the same day. On February 9, 2023, her nomination was reported out of committee by an 11–10 vote. Her nomination is pending before the United States Senate. If confirmed, Abudu would be the first African-American woman to sit on the Eleventh Circuit.

District court nominees

Confirmed nominees

United States District Court for the District of Massachusetts
Margaret R. Guzman:  On July 13, 2022, President Joe Biden nominated Guzman to serve as a United States district judge of the United States District Court for the District of Massachusetts. President Biden nominated Guzman to the seat vacated by Judge Timothy S. Hillman, who assumed senior status on July 1, 2022. On September 21, 2022, a hearing on her nomination was held before the Senate Judiciary Committee. Conservatives and law enforcement attacked the nomination, claiming that she is reflexively pro-criminal defendant and pointing out that Guzman had acquitted all 149 defendants who appeared before her in bench trials on drunk driving charges while serving as a judge on Dudley District Court. On December 1, 2022, her nomination was reported out committee by a 12–10 vote. On January 3, 2023, her nomination was returned to the President under Rule XXXI, Paragraph 6 of the United States Senate; she was renominated later the same day. On February 2, 2023, her nomination was reported out of committee by an 11–9 vote. On February 28, 2023, the Senate invoked cloture on her nomination by a 49–48 vote, with the Vice President Kamala Harris voting for the affirmative. On March 1, 2023, her nomination was confirmed by a 49–48 vote, with the vice president casting the tie breaking vote.

United States District Court for the District of Nevada
Anne Rachel Traum: On November 3, 2021, President Joe Biden announced his intent to nominate Traum to serve as a United States district judge of the United States District Court for the District of Nevada. On December 15, 2021, a hearing on her nomination was held before the Senate Judiciary Committee. The confirmation hearings were particularly contentious when questioned by Senator John Kennedy of Louisiana. He asked nine separate times whether [criminal misbehavior should be forgiven in the name of social justice], without receiving a direct yes or no response. On January 3, 2022, her nomination was returned to the President under Rule XXXI, Paragraph 6 of the United States Senate; she was later renominated the same day. On January 20, 2022, her nomination was reported out of committee by a 12–10 vote. On March 16, 2022, the United States Senate invoked cloture on her nomination by a 52–45 vote. On March 23, 2022, the United States Senate confirmed her nomination by a 49–47 vote.

United States District Court for the District of New Jersey
Christine O'Hearn: On April 29, 2021, President Joe Biden nominated O'Hearn to serve as a United States district judge for the United States District Court for the District of New Jersey to the seat vacated by Judge Robert B. Kugler, who assumed senior status on November 2, 2018. On June 23, 2021, a hearing on her nomination was held before the Senate Judiciary Committee.  Progressive magazine The American Prospect critiqued O'Hearn's nomination, saying she had "fought against workplace sexual harassment cases, defended police departments, and represented management during union drives."  On July 22, 2021, her nomination was reported out of committee by a 12–10 vote. On October 19, 2021, the Senate confirmed her nomination by a 53–44 vote.
Karen M. Williams: On March 30, 2021, President Joe Biden nominated Williams to serve as a United States district judge for the United States District Court for the District of New Jersey to the seat vacated by Judge Jerome B. Simandle, who assumed senior status on May 31, 2017. Progressive magazine The American Prospect criticized Williams' nomination, saying "Williams spent many years as a management-side labor and employment attorney, even arguing cases against workplace sexual harassment claims, a troubling background to those hoping for judicial appointments that might defend workers." On July 14, 2021, a hearing on her nomination was held before the Senate Judiciary Committee. On August 5, 2021, her nomination was reported out of committee by a 16–6 vote. On October 26, 2021, the United States Senate confirmed her nomination by a 56–38 vote.

United States District Court for the Southern District of New York
Jennifer H. Rearden: On May 4, 2020, President Donald Trump nominated her to a seat on the same court as part of a bipartisan package of nominees. She was renominated On January 19, 2022 by President Joe Biden to serve as a United States district judge of the United States District Court for the Southern District of New York. Rearden's nomination was criticized by Congresswoman Rashida Tlaib, who brought up Rearden's controversial role in the prosecution of Steven Donziger. Rearden represented Chevron in its countersuit against Donziger, an environmental lawyer who brought a class action case against Chevron related to environmental damage and health effects caused by oil drilling. On March 2, 2022, a hearing on her nomination was held before the Senate Judiciary Committee. On April 4, 2022, her nomination was reported out of committee by a 22–0 vote. On September 8, 2022, the United States Senate confirmed her nomination by a voice vote. After the Senate confirmed her nomination, U.S. Senator Elizabeth Warren announced that she would have voted against her nomination if the Senate proceeded to a roll call vote on Rearden's nomination.

United States District Court for the Western District of Washington
John H. Chun: On September 30, 2021, President Joe Biden announced his intent to nominate Chun to serve as a United States district judge of the United States District Court for the Western District of Washington. President Biden nominated Chun to the seat vacated by Judge James Robart, who assumed  senior status on June 28, 2016. Chun was attacked for his stance on Grutter v. Bollinger when he supported the right of universities to admit or reject people on the basis of race. On November 17, 2021, a hearing on his nomination was held before the Senate Judiciary Committee. On December 16, 2021, his nomination was reported out of committee. On January 3, 2022, his nomination was returned to the President under Rule XXXI, Paragraph 6 of the United States Senate; he was later renominated the same day.  On January 20, 2022, his nomination was reported out of committee by a 12–10 vote. On March 16, 2022, the United States Senate invoked cloture on his nomination by a 50–45 vote. On March 23, 2022, his nomination was confirmed by a 49–47 vote. He received his judicial commission on March 30, 2022. He was sworn into office by Chief Judge Ricardo S. Martinez on April 11, 2022. Chun is the first Asian American man to serve as a judge of the court.

Stalled nominees

United States District Court for the Central District of California
Hernán D. Vera: On September 8, 2021, President Joe Biden announced his intent to nominate Vera to serve as a United States district judge of the United States District Court for the Central District of California. On September 20, 2021, his nomination was sent to the Senate. President Biden nominated Vera to the seat vacated by Judge Margaret M. Morrow, who assumed senior status on October 29, 2015. On October 20, 2021, a hearing on his nomination was held before the Senate Judiciary Committee. On December 2, 2021, the Senate Judiciary Committee were deadlocked on his nomination by an 11–11 vote. On January 3, 2022, his nomination was returned to the President under Rule XXXI, Paragraph 6 of the United States Senate; he was later renominated the same day. On January 20, 2022, his nomination was deadlocked by an 11–11 vote. The Senate discharged his nomination from committee on June 22, 2022 by a 50–47 vote. On January 3, 2023, his nomination was returned to the president and he was renominated later the same day. On February 9, 2023, his nomination was reported out of committee by an 11–10 vote. His nomination is pending before the United States Senate.

United States District Court for the District of Columbia
Todd E. Edelman:  On July 29, 2022, President Joe Biden announced his intent to nominate Edelman to serve as a United States district judge of the United States District Court for the District of Columbia. On September 27, 2022, his nomination was sent to the Senate. President Biden nominated Edelman to the seat vacated by Judge Florence Y. Pan, who was elevated to the United States Court of Appeals for the District of Columbia Circuit. On November 15, 2022, a hearing on his nomination was held before the Senate Judiciary Committee. Republicans fiercely criticized Edelman as pro-criminal and anti public safety. In particular, they attacked his handling of the trial of Christian Wingfield.  Edelman released Wingfield before trial with an ankle monitor.  Shortly after his release, Wingfield was involved in the murder of a 10-year-old boy at a July 4, 2020 cookout. "A child is dead because Judge Edelman didn’t do his job, and now he wants a promotion," said Senator Marsha Blackburn after the hearing. Senator Tom Cotton remarked, "Crime in DC and around the country is skyrocketing, no thanks to lenient, liberal judges like Judge Edelman." On January 3, 2023, his nomination was returned to the President under Rule XXXI, Paragraph 6 of the United States Senate. He was renominated on January 23, 2023. On February 9, 2023, his nomination was reported out of committee by an 11–10 vote. His nomination is pending before the United States Senate.

United States District Court for the Eastern District of New York
Nusrat Jahan Choudhury: On January 19, 2022, President Joe Biden nominated Choudhury to serve as a United States district judge of the United States District Court for the Eastern District of New York. President Biden nominated Choudhury to the seat vacated by Judge Joseph F. Bianco, who was elevated to the United States Court of Appeals for the Second Circuit on May 17, 2019. A longtime lawyer for the ACLU, she immediately generated conservative objections.  On April 27, 2022, a contentious hearing on her nomination was held before the Senate Judiciary Committee. During her confirmation hearing, she was asked whether she had said "the killing of unarmed Black men by police happens every day in America." Choudhury at first testified she was not sure she made that statement but then said she "said it in my role as an advocate." Her testimony caused several law enforcement groups, including the Fraternal Order of Police and the Sergeants Benevolent Association, to oppose her nomination. Two weeks after her hearing, Choudhury sent a letter to the Judiciary Committee denying that she had made the statement. Republicans on the Judiciary Committee requested a second hearing due to Choudhury's contradictory statements, but Senator Dick Durbin rejected the request for a second hearing.  On May 26, 2022, her nomination was reported out of the committee by a 12–10 vote. On January 3, 2023, her nomination was returned to the President under Rule XXXI, Paragraph 6 of the United States Senate; she was renominated later the same day. On February 9, 2023, her nomination was reported out of committee by an 11–10 vote. Her nomination is pending before the United States Senate.

United States District Court for the Southern District of New York
Dale Ho: On September 30, 2021, President Biden nominated Ho to serve as a United States district judge of the United States District Court for the Southern District of New York, to the seat vacated by Judge Katherine B. Forrest, who resigned on September 11, 2018. On December 1, 2021, a hearing on his nomination was held before the Senate Judiciary Committee. During his confirmation hearing, Ho apologized for his "overheated rhetoric" on social media, which included past tweets critical of three Republican members of the Senate Judiciary Committee, Marsha Blackburn, Mike Lee, and Tom Cotton. He was questioned by senators over a tweet in which he appeared to refer to himself as a "wild-eyed sort of leftist"; he explained that he was "referring to a caricature of the way other people may have described me, not how I would describe myself." A resurfaced video from 2018 showed Ho calling the U.S. Senate and the Electoral College "undemocratic" and arguing that voting should be made easier and that people with criminal convictions should not lose the right to vote. The conservative Judicial Crisis Network launched a $300,000 television ad campaign against Ho (the group's first TV campaign against a Biden judicial nominee); in response, progressive group Demand Justice launched a six-figure ad campaign in support of Ho. On January 3, 2022, his nomination was returned to the President under Rule XXXI, Paragraph 6 of the United States Senate; he was later renominated the same day. On January 20, 2022, his nomination was deadlocked by an 11–11 vote. On January 3, 2023, his nomination was returned to the president and he was renominated later the same day. On February 9, 2023, his nomination was reported out of committee by an 11–10 vote. His nomination is pending before the United States Senate.

Failed nominees

United States District Court for the Eastern District of Wisconsin
William Pocan: On December 15, 2021, President Joe Biden nominated Pocan to serve as a United States district judge of the United States District Court for the Eastern District of Wisconsin. Biden nominated Pocan to the seat vacated by Judge William C. Griesbach, who assumed senior status on December 31, 2019. On February 15, 2022, U.S. senator Ron Johnson announced he would withhold his blue slip, effectively blocking Pocan from receiving a hearing in the Senate Judiciary Committee, complaining that the Court's Duty Station is in Green Bay while Pocan is from Milwaukee. On January 3, 2023, his nomination was returned to the President under Rule XXXI, Paragraph 6 of the United States Senate.

United States District Court for the Northern District of New York
Jorge Alberto Rodriguez: On July 13, 2022, President Joe Biden nominated Rodriguez to serve as a United States district judge of the United States District Court for the Northern District of New York. President Biden nominated Rodriguez to the seat vacated by Judge David N. Hurd, who would assume senior status upon confirmation of a successor. On July 14, 2022, one day after President Biden nominated Rodriguez of Clifton Park, an Albany-based assistant attorney general, Hurd wrote another letter to President Biden. In the letter, Hurd wrote “Please be advised that I immediately rescind my decision to take senior status as a United States District Judge for the Northern District of New York". “I will take senior status if a confirmed successor lives in this area and is permanently assigned to the United States Courthouse in Utica, New York. Otherwise, I shall remain on full-time active status until I retire or die.” On August 8, 2022, Kirsten Gillibrand's chief of staff Jess Fassler said “It has always been the expectation that Judge Hurd’s successor would sit in the Utica courthouse, and Jorge Rodriguez has committed to doing so”. On August 10, 2022, Judge Hurd wrote a letter to Biden to officially rescind his senior status and remain in active service. On January 3, 2023, his nomination was returned to the President under Rule XXXI, Paragraph 6 of the United States Senate.

See also
 List of federal judges appointed by Joe Biden
 Joe Biden Supreme Court candidates
 United States federal judge
 Judicial appointment history for United States federal courts
 Deaths of United States federal judges in active service

References 

Biden, Joe
 
Judicial appointments